Tzath I, Tzathius or Tzathios in Byzantine sources, was king of Lazica (western Georgia) from 521/522 to an unknown date. He rejected Sassanid Persian overlordship and turned to the Byzantine emperor Justin I (r. 518–527) for aid. He was the first Christian king of Lazica.

Tzath was the son of Damnazes, of whom almost nothing is known. Upon his father's death, in 521 or 522, he refused to recognize the traditional suzerainty exercised by the Persian ruler over Lazica, rejected Zoroastrianism, and instead turned to the Byzantine Empire. He went to Constantinople, where he was received by Emperor Justin I, baptized as a Christian, and wedded to a noble wife, Valeriana. After having received the insignia and royal robes that signified both his royal status and his submission to the Byzantine emperor, he returned to Lazica.

Tzath is mentioned for the last time with the outbreak of the Iberian War in 527, when Lazica was attacked by the Persians, who had easily overrun the rebellious Iberians. He sent for aid to Emperor Justinian I (r. 527–565), who had just succeeded his uncle Justin. Justinian responded by sending an army, which allowed Lazica to resist the Persians successfully.

Professor Cyril Toumanoff has conjectured that Tzath's reign lasted until circa 540, when he was succeeded by his possible son, Gubazes II. Opsites, an uncle of Gubazes, is mentioned by the 6th-century Byzantine historian Procopius as "king of the Lazi" on one occasion and as prince of east Abasgia on the other. If indeed a king, Opsites's reign may well be placed between those of Tzath and Gubazes. Toumanoff, however, further assumes that Opsites was a member of the Lazic royal family and prince of Abasgia, but never a king of Lazica, thus making Gubazes a direct successor of Tzath I.

References

Sources

6th-century monarchs in Europe
Converts to Christianity
Kings of Lazica
People of the Roman–Sasanian Wars
Iberian War